Jamileh Sorouri (born 8 March 1950) is an Iranian Gymnast who participated in 1964 Summer Olympics. She is the first, and so far only, female artistic gymnast to have represented Iran at the Olympics.

References
 Jamileh Sorouri sports-reference.com

1950 births
Gymnasts at the 1964 Summer Olympics
Living people
Iranian female artistic gymnasts
Olympic gymnasts of Iran
Place of birth missing (living people)